Shawe is the surname of:

 Bonnie Lythgoe (born 1949), née Shawe, British dancer and theatre producer and director
 Charles Shawe (1878–1951), English cricketer
 John Shawe (disambiguation)
 Phillip Shawe (1889–1945), Australian cricketer
 R. Shawe, English cricketer who played in 1845
 Richard Shawe, a canon of Windsor from 1376 to 1403
 Robert Shawe (c. 1699–1752), Irish academic and clergyman

See also
Shaw (disambiguation)